Mount Honey is the highest point on Campbell Island, the southernmost of New Zealand's subantarctic outlying islands.

References

Honey
Honey